Rodrigo Faust (born 14 September 1995) is an Argentine footballer who plays as a forward for OFK Petrovac in Montenegro.

Career
Faust started his senior career with Primera División side Huracán in 2017. On 7 July, he signed his first professional contract with the club. A month later, on 7 August, Faust was loaned out to UAI Urquiza of Primera B Metropolitana. His first match for UAI Urquiza arrived on 3 September in a goalless draw versus Estudiantes. In July 2018, Faust completed a permanent move to fellow Primera B Metropolitana team San Miguel. He didn't make a competitive appearance for San Miguel, departing on 10 January 2019 to join Atlético Paraná in Torneo Federal A.

Career statistics
.

References

External links

1995 births
Living people
Place of birth missing (living people)
Argentine footballers
Association football forwards
Argentine Primera División players
Primera B Metropolitana players
Club Atlético Huracán footballers
UAI Urquiza players
Club Atlético San Miguel footballers
Club Atlético Paraná players
Deportivo Laferrere footballers